Ghungrana is a village located in the Ludhiana West tehsil, of Ludhiana district, Punjab.

Administration
The village is administrated by Sarpanch Major Singh Pehlwan's wife who is an elected representative of village as per constitution of India and Panchayati raj (India). The village has a very old railway station. The towns of Dehlon and Ahemdgarh are in close proximity to the village. Ghunghrana is surrounded by villages Kalakh, Jartauli and Rangian. It falls under Pakhowal block and police station Jodhan. 

The village in the region is known to be the village of Sardars.
The ex chairman of Punjab Agro Industries Punjab Sardar Jagjit Singh Dhillon belongs to the village. Most residents of Ghunghrana belong to the Jatt clan Dhillon. Dry port has been constructed in the land of the village and adjoining village Khera.

Child Sex Ratio details
The village population of children with an age group from 0-6 is 329 which makes up 9.99% of total population of village. Average Sex Ratio is 865 per 1000 males which is lower than  the state average of 895. The child Sex Ratio as per census is  552, lower  than  average of 846 in the state of Punjab.

Villages in Ludhiana West Tehsil

Air travel connectivity 
The closest airport to the village is Sahnewal Airport.

External links
  Villages in Ludhiana West Tehsil

References

Villages in Ludhiana West tehsil